John G. Kerr may refer to:

 John Glasgow Kerr (1824–1901), American physician and medical missionary
 John Graham Kerr (1869–1957), Scottish embryologist and Member of Parliament

See also
John Kerr (disambiguation)